James Augustine Skipper (born January 23, 1949) is a former American football coach who was best known for being the running backs coach for the Carolina Panthers of the National Football League (NFL) for 15 years (over two separate stretches). He was also the offensive coordinator for the New York Giants for three years, starting in 1997.

Early years
A native of Brawley, California, Skipper was an all-conference selection at Imperial Valley College, where he led the league in kickoff returns. He then transferred to Whittier College, where he played defensive back and he paced the conference in punt returns during his career. Skipper holds a B.A. degree in physical education from Whittier.

Coaching career
Skipper began his coaching career at California State Polytechnic University, Pomona, where he coached the defensive backs from 1974-1976.  After coaching the defensive backs for two seasons at San Jose State University, Skipper moved to the offensive side of the ball, coaching the running backs at University of the Pacific in 1979.  He then went on to coach the running backs at University of Oregon from 1980-1982 before he made the jump to the professional ranks.

Skipper started his professional coaching career with the Philadelphia/Baltimore Stars of the United States Football League from 1983-1985.  He then moved on to the National Football League with the New Orleans Saints.  Starting in 1986, Skipper served as the running back coach till 1995. During his 10-year tenure with New Orleans, Skipper coached two Pro Bowlers, Rueben Mayes in 1986 and 1987 and Dalton Hilliard in 1989. Mayes' 1,353 yards in 1986 and Hilliard's 1,262 in 1989 still stand among the 10 highest single-season rushing totals in Saints history.  He became the running backs coach for the Carolina Panthers since 2002.  In 2009, Skipper helped make NFL history as two of his running backs, DeAngelo Williams and Jonathan Stewart, became the first set of teammates ever to rush for over 1,100 yards in the same season.  He was announced as the running backs coach for the Tennessee Titans on February 18, 2011.  He returned to the Carolina Panthers coaching staff in 2013, coaching running backs.

In the 2015 season, Skipper and the Panthers reached Super Bowl 50 on February 7, 2016. The Panthers fell to the Denver Broncos by a score of 24–10.

After the 2018 season, Skipper announced his retirement from coaching.

Personal
He has two sons, who are also football coaches: Tim Skipper, currently the linebackers coach at Fresno State and Kelly Skipper, currently the running backs coach for the Buffalo Bills.

Head coaching record

XFL

Pro Bowl running backs under Jim Skipper
Rueben Mayes- 1986 & 1987
Dalton Hilliard- 1989
Larry Centers- 1996
Stephen Davis- 2003
DeAngelo Williams- 2009
Mike Tolbert- 2013, 2015 & 2016
Jonathan Stewart- 2015

1,000 yard rushers under Jim Skipper
Rueben Mayes- 1986
Dalton Hilliard- 1989
Gary Brown- 1998
Tiki Barber- 2000
Stephen Davis- 2003
DeAngelo Williams- 2008
Jonathan Stewart- 2009
DeAngelo Williams- 2009
Chris Johnson- 2011 & 2012
Christian McCaffrey- 2018

References

External links
 Carolina Panthers bio

1949 births
Living people
American football defensive backs
Carolina Panthers coaches
New Orleans Saints coaches
New York Giants coaches
Oregon Ducks football coaches
San Jose State Spartans football coaches
Sportspeople from Southern California
United States Football League coaches
San Francisco Demons coaches
Whittier Poets football players
People from Breaux Bridge, Louisiana
People from Brawley, California
Players of American football from California
Players of American football from Louisiana
Tennessee Titans coaches
Pacific Tigers football coaches
Cal Poly Pomona Broncos football coaches